The Independent Party of Connecticut (IPC) is a minor political party in the State of Connecticut. As of November 3, 2014, Connecticut had 16,189 active voters registered with the Connecticut Secretary of State with the Independent party, making it the third largest party in the state. The party has at least one elected official. In November, 2013, Lawrence DePillo was elected to the Waterbury Board of Aldermen.

After a controversial 2022 Independent Party gubernatorial convention in which embattled party chairman Mike Telesca voted again to break a 79-79 tie between businessman Bob Stefanowski and Rob Hotaling, the Party nominated the unknown Hotaling. Hotaling failed to garner the necessary 1% to maintain ballot access for the Independent Party, and as a result, any Independent Party member who does not live in an area governed by a local IP town committee forfeits their membership.

History
In the 1930s, an Independent-Republican party was formed by Professor Albert Levitt of Redding, CT and Irving Fisher, a Yale economist. However, the official title of "Independent Party" was used later on. In 1958, Andrew C. LaCroix of Easton, Connecticut was acting treasurer of the Independent Party of Connecticut. The party backed Ms. Vivian Kellems of Stonington, Connecticut in a 1956 write-in campaign. At that time, Anthony Sparaco of Old Saybrook was president, and Rosemary Favale of Waterbury was vice-president. In 1959, Charles R. Iovino of Milford, Connecticut was also elected as an Independent write-in candidate.  As early as 1967, the Independent Party of Connecticut has successfully held meetings throughout the State. However, it is speculated that the Independent Party of Connecticut was actually formed on August 23, 1966. Recently, the IPC became an affiliate of the Alliance Party.

Town committees
An Independent Town Committee is local organization that affiliates with the State-Central Executive Board. According to bylaws, they must consist of a Chairman, Vice-Chairman, Secretary, and Treasurer.

Town committees by city/town

 Bethel, Connecticut 
 Bridgeport, Connecticut 
 East Haven, Connecticut
 Milford, Connecticut
 Middletown, Connecticut
 Newtown, Connecticut
 Waterbury, Connecticut
 Watertown, Connecticut
 Winsted, Connecticut- Samuel Demonstranti, Chairman- David LaPointe, Treasurer

No Independent Party candidate of note has ever been elected in their own right.

References

Political parties in Connecticut
Centrist political parties in the United States
Political parties established in 1966
Progressive parties in the United States
Social liberal parties in the United States
1966 establishments in Connecticut
Conservative parties in the United States